The Autostrada A7 is an Italian motorway which connects Milan to Genoa.

The Milan - Serravalle Scrivia section of the motorway was operated by Milano Serravalle – Milano Tangenziali, which the concession would last until 2028.

External links 
Autostrade per l'Italia
Milano Mare - Milano Tangenziali
Storia dell'Autocamionale Genova - Serravalle

References

Buildings and structures completed in 1935
Autostrade in Italy
Transport in Lombardy
Transport in Piedmont
Transport in Liguria

it:Autostrada A7